The epithet "the Simple" may refer to:

Abraham the Poor or the Simple (died 372), Egyptian hermit and saint
Bagrat II of Iberia (937–994), King of (Caucasian) Iberia
Charles the Simple (879-929), King of France
Frederick the Simple (1341-1377), King of Sicily
Paul the Simple (died c. 339), Christian saint, monk and hermit
William, Count of Sully (c. 1085–c. 1150), also Count of Blois and Count of Chartres

Lists of people by epithet